The Schlegel-Tieck Prize for German Translation is a literary translation award given by the Society of Authors in London.  Translations from the German original into English are considered for the prize. The value of the prize is £3,000. The prize is named for August Wilhelm Schlegel and Ludwig Tieck, who translated Shakespeare to German in the 19th century.

Winners
1965 
 Winner: Michael Bullock for The Thirtieth Year by Ingeborg Bachmann (Andre Deutsch) and Report on Bruno by Joseph Breitbach (Jonathan Cape)

1966 
 Winner: Ralph Manheim for Dog Years by Günter Grass (Secker & Warburg)

1967 
 Winner: James Strachey for The Works of Sigmund Freud (Hogarth Press)

1968 
 Winner: Henry Collins for History of the International by Julius Braunthal (Nelson)

1969 
 Winner: Leila Vennewitz for The End of a Mission by Heinrich Böll (Weidenfeld & Nicolson)

1970 
 Winner: Eric Mosbacher for Society without the Father by Alexander Mitscherlich (Tavistock)

1971 
 Winner: Ewald Osers for Scorched Earth by Paul Carell (Harrap)

1972
 Winner: Richard Barry for The Brutal Takeover by Kurt von Schuschnigg (Weidenfeld & Nicolson)

1973 
 Winner: Geoffrey Strachan for Love and Hate by Irenäus Eibl-Eibesfeldt (Methuen)

1974 
 Winner: Geoffrey Skelton for Frieda Lawrence by Robert Lucas (Secker & Warburg)

1975 
 Winner: John Bowden for Judaism and Hellenism by Martin Hengel (SCM Press)

1976
 Winner: Marian Jackson (deceased) for War of Illusions by Fritz Fischer (Chatto & Windus)

1977 
 Winners: Charles Kessler for Wallenstein: His Life Narrated by Golo Mann (Andre Deutsch); Ralph Manheim for The Resistible Rise of Arturo Ui by Bertolt Brecht (Methuen)

1978 
 Winner: Michael Hamburger for German Poetry 1910–1975 (Carcanet)

1979 
 Winners: Ralph Manheim for Die Flunder (The Flounder) by Günter Grass (Secker & Warburg); John Brownjohn for People and Politics by Willy Brandt (HarperCollins)

1980
 Winners: Janet Seligman for The English House by Herman Muthesius (Granada); David Harvey & Hazel Harvey for Sophocles by Karl Reinhardt (Blackwell)

1981
 Winners: Michael Hamburger for Poems by Paul Celan (Carcanet); Edward Quinn for Does God Exist? by Hans Küng (HarperCollins)

1982
 Winner: Eric Mosbacher for The Wolf by Eric Zimen (Souvenir)

1983
 Winners: Paul Falla & A.J. Ryder for A History of European Integration, 1945–47 by Walter Lipgens (Clarendon Press); Arnold Pomerans for A Small Yes and a Big No by George Grosz (Allison & Busby)

1984
 Winner: Patricia Crampton for Marbot by Wolfgang Hildesheimer (Dent)

1985
 Winner: John Bowden for The Authority of the Bible and the Rise of the Modern World by Henning Graf Reventlow (SCM Press)

1986
 Winners: Christopher Middleton for The Spectacle at the Tower by Gert Hofmann (Carcanet); Allan Blunden for Pro and Contra Wagner by Thomas Mann (Faber and Faber)

1987
 Winner: Anthea Bell for The Stone and the Flute by Hans Bemmann (Viking Press)

1988
 Winners: Ralph Manheim for The Rat by Günter Grass (Secker & Warburg); Michael Hofmann for Der Kontrabaß (The Double-Bass) by Patrick Süskind (Hamish Hamilton)

1989
 Winners: Quintin Hoare for The Town Park & Other Stories by Herman Grab (Verso); Peter Tegel for The Snake Tree by Uwe Timm (Picador)

1990
 Winner: David McLintock for Women in a River Landscape by Heinrich Böll (Secker & Warburg)

1991
 Winners: John E. Woods for The Last World by Christoph Ransmayr (Chatto & Windus); Hugh Young for The Story of the Last Thought by Edgar Hilsenrath (Penguin)

1992
 Winner: Geoffrey Skelton for The Training Ground by Siegfried Lenz (Methuen)

1993
 Winners: John Brownjohn for The Swedish Cavaliers by Leo Perutz (Harvill Secker); John Brownjohn for Infanta by Bodo Kirchhoff (Harvill Secker); Michael Hofmann for Death in Rome by Wolfgang Koeppen (Hamish Hamilton)

1994
 Winner: Krishna Winston for Goebbels by Ralf Georg Reuth (Constable)

1995
 Winners: Ronald Speirs  for Political Writings of Max Weber (CUP); William Yuill for The Making of Europe: The Enlightenment by Ulrich im Hof (Blackwell)

1996
 Winners: David McLintock for Extinction by Thomas Bernhardt (Quartet); David McLintock for Caesar by Christian Meier (HarperCollins)

1997
 Winner: Shaun Whiteside for Magdalena the Sinner by Lilian Faschinger (Headline Review)

1998
 Winner: Mike Mitchell for Letters Back to Ancient China by Herbert Rosendörfer (Dedalus)
 Runner-up: J.A. Underwood for Das Schloss (The Castle) by Franz Kafka (Penguin)

1999
 Winner: John Brownjohn for Heroes Like Us by Thomas Brussig (Harvill Secker)

2000
 Winner: Joyce Crick for The Interpretation of Dreams by Sigmund Freud (OUP)
 Runner-up: Patrick Bridgwater for Duino Elegies by Rainer Maria Rilke (Menard Press)

2001
 Winner: Krishna Winston for Too Far Afield by Günter Grass (Faber and Faber)
 Runner-up: Anthea Bell for Vienna Passion by Lilian Faschinger (Headline Review)

2002
 Winner: Anthea Bell for Austerlitz by W.G. Sebald (Hamish Hamilton)
 Runner-up: John Felstiner for The Poems and Prose of Paul Celan (Norton)

2003
 Winner: Anthea Bell for Rain by Karen Duve (Bloomsbury)
 Runner-up: Michael Hofmann for Luck by Gert Hofmann (Harvill Secker)

2004
 Winner: Martin Chalmers for The Lesser Evil: The Diaries of Victor Klemperer, 1945–59 (Weidenfeld & Nicolson)

2005
 Winner: Karen Leeder for Selected Poems by Evelyn Schlag (Carcanet)
 Runner-up: Michael Hofmann for The Stalin Organ by Gert Ledig (Granta)

2006
 Winner: Philip Boehm for A Woman in Berlin by anonymous (Virago Press)
 Runner-up: Caroline Mustill for A Little History of the World by E.H. Gombrich (Yale University Press)

2007
 Winner: Sally-Ann Spencer for The Swarm by Frank Schätzing (Hodder)
 Runner-up: Anthea Bell for Vienna by Eva Menasse (Weidenfeld & Nicolson)

2008
 Winner: Ian Fairley for Snow Part by Paul Celan (Carcanet)
 Runner-up: Anthea Bell for Amok and Other Stories by Stefan Zweig (Pushkin Press)

2009 
 Winner: Anthea Bell for Burning Secret by Stefan Zweig (Pushkin Press)
 Runner-up: Michael Hofmann for The Seventh Well by Fred Wander (Granta)

2010 
 Winner: Breon Mitchell for Die Blechtrommel The Tin Drum by Günter Grass (Harvill Secker)
 Runner-up: Allan Blunden for The Return of the State? by Erhard Eppler (Forum Press)

2011 
 Winner: Damion Searls for Comedy in a Minor Key by Hans Keilson (Hesperus Press)
 Runner-up: Michael Hofmann for Angina Days: Selected Poems by Günter Eich (Princeton University Press)

2012 
 Winner: Vincent Kling for a translation of Why the Child is Cooking in the Polenta by Aglaja Veteranyi (Dalkey Archive Press)
 Commended: Ross Benjamin for a translation of Funeral for a Dog by Thomas Pletzinger (Norton)

2013
 Winner: Ian Crockatt for a translation of Pure Contradiction – Selected Poems by Rainer Maria Rilke (Arc Publications)
 Commended: Jamie Bulloch for a translation of Sea of Ink by Richard Weihe (Peirene Press)

2014
 Winner: Jamie Bulloch for a translation of The Mussel Feast by Birgit Vanderbecke (Peirene Press)
 Commended: Anthea Bell for a translation of In Times of Fading Light by Eugen Ruge (Graywolf Press)

2015
 Winner: Susan Bernofsky for a translation of The End of Days by Jenny Erpenbeck (Portobello Books)
 Commended: Shaun Whiteside for a translation of The Giraffe's Neck by Judith Schalansky (Bloomsbury)

2016
 Winner: Iain Galbraith for a translation of Self-Portrait With A Swarm of Bees by Jan Wagner (Arc Publications)
 Commended: Anthea Bell for a translation of All for Nothing by Walter Kempowski (Granta)

2017
 Winner: Allan Blunden for a translation of Nightmare in Berlin by Hans Fallada (Scribe)
 Commended: Katy Derbyshire for a translation of Bricks and Mortar by Clemens Meyer (Fitzcarraldo Editions)

2018
 Winner: Tony Crawford for a translation of Wonder Beyond Belief by Navid Kermani (Polity Press)
 Runner-up: Tess Lewis for a translation of Kruso by Lutz Seiler (Scribe)
 Short-listed:
Susan Bernofsky for a translation of Go, Went, Gone by Jenny Erpenbeck (Granta)
 Jen Calleja for a translation of Dance by the Canal by Kerstin Hensel (Peirene Press)
 Stefan Tobler for a translation of The Old King in His Exile by Arno Geiger (And Other Stories)

2019
 Winner. Iain Galbraith for a translation of River by Esther Kinsky (Fitzcarraldo Editions)
 Runner Up: Karen Leeder for a translation of Thick of It by Ulrike Almut Sandig (Seagull Books)
 Shortlisted:
 Margot Bettauer Dembo for a translation of The Seventh Cross by Anna Seghers (Virago Press)
 Katy Derbyshire for a translation of Gentleman Jack by Angela Steidele (Serpent's Tail)
 Simon Pare for a translation of The Flying Mountain by Christoph Ransmayr (Seagull Books)
 Damion Searls for a translation of Anniversaries: From a Year in the Life of Cresspahl by Uwe Johnson (New York Review Books)

2020
 Winner: Martyn Crucefix for his translation of These Numbered Days by Peter Huchel (Shearsman Books)
 Runner-up: Jamie Bulloch for his translation of You Would Have Missed Me by Birgit Vanderbeke (Peirene Press)
 Shortlisted:
 Joel Agee for a translation of Agathe: Or, the Forgotten Sister by Robert Musil (New York Review Books) 
 Imogen Taylor for a translation of Beside Myself by Sasha Marianna Salzmann (Text Publishing) 
 Karen Leeder for a translation of The Sex of the Angels, the Saints in their Heaven by Raoul Schrott (Seagull Books)
 Sinead Crowe and Rachel McNicholl for a translation of The Storyteller by Pierre Jarawan (World Editions)

2021
Winners:
 Winner: Karen Leeder for a translation of Porcelain: Poem on the Downfall of My City by Durs Grünbein (Seagull Books)
 Runner up: Simon Pare for a translation of Cox; or, The Course of Time by Christoph Ransmayr (Seagull Books)
 Shortlisted:
 Jamie Bulloch for a translation of The Day My Grandfather Was a Hero by Paulus Hochgatterer (MacLehose Press)
 Jamie Bulloch for a translation of The Hungry and the Fat by Timur Vermes (MacLehose Press)
 Sophie Duvernoy for a translation of Käsebier Takes Berlin by Gabriele Tergit (Pushkin Press)

References

Translation awards
British literary awards